The North Wales Coast Line, also known as the North Wales Main Line ( or ), is a major railway line in the north of Wales and Cheshire, England, running from Crewe on the West Coast Main Line to Holyhead on the Isle of Anglesey. The line has 19 stations, with all except two, Chester and Crewe, being in Wales. 

The line is not currently electrified, so Avanti West Coast, the current operator of the West Coast Partnership franchise, currently uses Class 221 Super Voyagers, which they have done since December 2007, on routes to Holyhead.

The line contains several notable engineering structures, including Conwy railway bridge across the River Conwy, and Britannia Bridge across the Menai Strait.

History
The first section from Crewe to Chester was built by the Chester and Crewe Railway and absorbed by the Grand Junction Railway shortly before opening in 1840. The remainder was built between 1844 and 1850 by the Chester and Holyhead Railway Company as the route of the Irish Mail services to Dublin. The line was later incorporated into the London and North Western Railway. Between Chester and Saltney Junction, the line was, from the start, used by trains of the Shrewsbury and Chester Railway, later to be incorporated into the Great Western Railway.

So important was the line in the 19th and early 20th centuries to passenger, mail and freight traffic between Britain and Ireland that the world's first experimental and operational water troughs were installed at Mochdre, between Colwyn Bay and Llandudno Junction. Their purpose was to enable steam engines (especially on the Irish Mail) to collect water without stopping. Later, considerable stretches of line between Chester and Colwyn Bay were quadrupled to increase line capacity, but these sections have now been reduced to two tracks.

Modern day
In 2018, a £50 million signalling upgrade programme was completed between Shotton and Colwyn Bay. This upgrade saw modular colour lights supervised from the South Wales Rail Operating Centre in Cardiff replacing the manual signal boxes and mixture of semaphore and older colour lights.

Main calling points

The places served by the route are as follows:
Crewe
Chester
Wirral Line diverges to serve Birkenhead and Liverpool (Merseyrail)
Line diverges to serve Wrexham, Shrewsbury and Cardiff (via the Shrewsbury to Chester Line), and Manchester, Warrington and Runcorn (via the Mid-Cheshire line and Chester–Warrington line).
Shotton
The Borderlands Line connecting Wrexham to Bidston crosses at Shotton with interchange facilities.
Flint
Prestatyn
Rhyl
Abergele
Colwyn Bay
Llandudno Junction
Lines diverge to serve Blaenau Ffestiniog and Llandudno (via the Conwy Valley Line)
Conwy
Penmaenmawr
Llanfairfechan
Bangor
Llanfairpwll
Line diverges to Amlwch (Anglesey Central Railway, disused)
Bodorgan
Ty Croes
Rhosneigr
Valley
Freight from Wylfa nuclear power station is loaded at a depot in Valley
Holyhead

Services

Principal through passenger services are London Euston to Holyhead, Bangor, Chester and Wrexham General operated by Avanti West Coast and Crewe to Holyhead, Cardiff to Holyhead and Manchester to Llandudno currently operated by Transport for Wales Rail. A revised timetable has operated since December 2005 incorporating a new service to and from Cardiff Central every two hours. The line still provides the UK railway part of the through passenger service to Dublin using fast car ferries from Holyhead to Dublin Port.

Future

The Welsh Government would like the line to be electrified, especially if Crewe becomes a rail hub due to HS2 in 2026. Chancellor George Osborne said in July 2015 that there was a "really strong case" for electrification of the line. The Electrification Task Force said that the Chester to Crewe line was a Tier 2 priority for being electrified in the CP6 period (2019-2024).

New trains
Class 221 units currently operate long-distance services to Holyhead from London Euston for Avanti West Coast. These are due to be replaced by Class 805 units in 2023. These new units will be able to run using the overhead wires from Euston to Crewe, before  switching to diesel power from Crewe to Holyhead.

Transport for Wales Rail operate regional services using Class 175 and Class 158 units. These will be replaced from 2022 onwards by Class 197 units.

Proposed stations 

There are two proposed railway stations on the line, proposed as part of the North Wales Metro. The two stations are both in Flintshire: at Greenfield and Broughton.

References

Further reading

Railway lines in Wales
Railway lines in North West England
Standard gauge railways in Wales
Standard gauge railways in England
Railway lines opened in 1850